"I Need a Doctor" is a single by American rapper Dr. Dre featuring fellow American rapper Eminem and American singer Skylar Grey. The song was produced by Alex da Kid and released for digital download through the American iTunes Store on February 1, 2011.

Musically, "I Need a Doctor" is predominantly a rap song, backed by a "spacey", drum-heavy production, with extra piano keys featured in the introduction and the chorus. Lyrically, the song is largely about Dr. Dre and Eminem's close friendship, and how they have often needed and inspired each other in the past.

Even though the song was leaked onto the Internet several months in advance of its release, it became a significant commercial success on its official release, particularly in the United States, where it peaked at number 4 on the Billboard Hot 100, making it Dr. Dre's second highest peaking song on the chart ever. It also peaked in the upper regions of many other national charts. As of October 2011, it had sold over 2,206,000 digital copies in the United States alone, thus making it a double platinum record as certified by the RIAA.

Background
The official version premiered through Dr. Dre's official website.

Skylar Grey said that she and da Kid came to the studio with the hook and "the track" prepared; [Dre and Eminem] loved it. Eminem had then gone into the back room, and came out two hours later, and said that he was done writing his verses. Grey also said that she was in tears when she heard Eminem's verses for the first time and that da Kid initially proposed featuring Lady Gaga on the hook, but Eminem insisted on having Grey's vocals, and said that they were not taking her voice off the track. In the song Eminem raps two verses about his mentor, thanking Dre for believing in him in his early days and returning the favor, before Dre delivers the song's final verse. The song's theme is about Dre's life, how it affected him, and that Eminem would be there for him since he was always there for Eminem.

Music video
The video for "I Need a Doctor" was shot with Allen Hughes, the director of Menace II Society, From Hell and The Book of Eli.  The video premiered on February 24, 2011.

The video begins with an introduction of Dr. Dre's music career, such as when he and fellow N.W.A member DJ Yella were in the 1980s funk group World Class Wreckin' Cru. There are also scenes of Dr. Dre and his family, such as him hugging his daughter and son and getting married. There are also snippets from past music videos. It includes many rappers such as Eazy-E, 2Pac, The D.O.C, Snoop Dogg, Warren G, Nate Dogg, Eminem, Xzibit and all the rest of the members from N.W.A. The video then features Dr. Dre driving down Pacific Coast Highway in a Ferrari 360, with flashbacks of his life, crashing his car and the last thing heard was his daughter say "Good night Daddy." Then he is transported to a medical facility. The date at the beginning of the video is February 18, 2001 (his 36th birthday). They fast-forward to present day ten years later, where he has been hospitalized and is on life support. The Marin County Civic Center stands in for the medical facility. HP Touchstone / Touch-to-Share technology is featured as the way medical data is transferred from the doctor's phone to the medical tablet.  Eminem raps next to him as he is floating in an isolation tank, during which the figure of the Pythia (played by Canadian actress Estella Warren) is singing as a hologram behind and over Dre, mouthing the words to Skylar Grey's vocal part in the song. Skylar Grey herself appears as one of the doctors in the video, but never actually appears singing her part. Dre eventually wakes up and goes through rehab, and the video ends with him standing next to the grave of Eazy-E, a rapper who had launched Dre's music career by founding N.W.A and was also a member along with Ice Cube, MC Ren and DJ Yella. A ticking clock is heard midway through the video. The music video received complaints of being an "act of advertising" for a variety of product placements, such as Ferrari, G-Shock, HP, Gatorade, and Dr. Dre's signature headphones, Beats by Dr. Dre.

On August 17, 2012 the music video was VEVOCertified after receiving more than 100,000,000 views on YouTube.

Live performances
Dr. Dre, Eminem and Skylar Grey performed the song at the 2011 Grammy Awards as part of a medley with "Love the Way You Lie (Part II)" performed by Rihanna, Adam Levine and Eminem.
Eminem performed the first verse at the 2012 Coachella Festival.

Critical reception
Nick Levine of Digital Spy gave the song a very positive review - rating the song five stars out of five; "Why is 'I Need a Doctor' such a brilliant single? Well, first of all there's the production from British knob-twiddling whizz Alex da Kid, which has a similar gravitas and bone-rattling bombast to his work on 'Love the Way You Lie' and 'Airplanes'. Then there's the haunting chorus, delivered by Diddy's 'Coming Home' bud Skylar Grey, which inhabits you from first listen. However, what elevates 'I Need A Doctor' from "very good" to "a little bit special" are the performances of Dre and Em. [...] That single manly tear dribbling down your cheek? Entirely, entirely justified."

Awards and nominations

On November 30, 2011, "I Need a Doctor" was nominated for the Grammy Awards for Best Rap/Sung Collaboration and Best Rap Song, both of which Kanye West won for his single "All of the Lights" from My Beautiful Dark Twisted Fantasy (2010).

Track listing
German CD single

Charts

Chart performance
The track first appeared on the UK Singles Chart, at number 21 on February 6, 2011—being Dr. Dre's sixth highest-charting single in the UK and his ninth Top 40 single. It has since peaked at #8 as of March 27, 2011. It debuted at number-5 on the Billboard Hot 100 with sales of 226,000, becoming his first top-ten single as lead artist on the chart in 16 years, since "Keep Their Heads Ringin" reached #10 in 1995, also that number of sales was enough to earn a #1 in the chart Hot Digital Songs in February, 19. It is also his second highest peak on the chart ever as lead artist, behind only "Nuthin' but a 'G' Thang" which peaked at #2 in 1993. It has since peaked at #4 after selling 283,000 in its third week on the charts, the resurgence in sales seemingly due to its performance at the 2011 Grammy Awards.

Weekly charts

Year-end charts

Certifications

Release history

References

External links

Eminem's watch in I need a doctor - www.marshallmathers.com

2010s ballads
2011 singles
Dr. Dre songs
Eminem songs
Skylar Grey songs
Song recordings produced by Alex da Kid
Songs written by Dr. Dre
Songs written by Eminem
2011 songs
Aftermath Entertainment singles
Interscope Records singles
Songs written by Skylar Grey
Songs written by Alex da Kid
Songs about friendship
Songs about musicians
Cultural depictions of hip hop musicians